Etena (meaning "Eden") is a deserted village on Swains Island, American Samoa.

Description and history
Etena is located on the south side of Swains Island about 0.75 miles east of the atoll's sole village and harbor, Taulaga.  It was constructed during the 19th century as the location for the "residency" of the island's European owners and "proprietors," the Jennings family.  A four-bedroom, colonial-style residence was constructed there and occupied by family members for several years, but has since been abandoned and is now in a state of disrepair and largely overgrown by island vegetation. A nearby graveyard contains the remains of several early island residents.

Etena is deserted, with all Swains Island residents living in Taulaga.

References

American Samoa